Lake Wales Municipal Airport  is a public-use airport located  west of the central business district of the city of Lake Wales in Polk County, Florida, United States. The airport is publicly owned.

Overview
The airport's service area includes the cities of Lake Wales, Dundee, Eagle Lake, Fort Meade, Frostproof, Highland Park, Hillcrest Heights, and Lake Hamilton. Typical operations conducted at the airport are local and transient general aviation, localized recreational glider activity, and skydiving. Presently there are no air carrier, commuter or air taxi operations conducted at the airport.

The airport's current role and classification are listed in the FAA's National Plan of Integrated Airport System (NPIAS) as a General Utility General Aviation Airport capable of accommodating virtually all general aviation aircraft with maximum gross takeoff weights of 12,500 pounds or less with wingspans up to, but not including, 79 feet.

History
Opened in 1928 as a civil airport, in 1943 the airport was leased by the United States Army Air Forces as an auxiliary airfield of Sarasota Army Airfield. III Fighter Command used Lake Wales Army Airfield for fighter training of replacement personnel. The Army improved the facility which included the construction of the two present 4,000-foot runways. No permanent units were assigned.

It was inactivated in 1945 and returned to civil control.

See also

 Florida World War II Army Airfields

References

 Lake Wales Municipal Airport
 World War II airfields database: Florida

External links

1928 establishments in Florida
Airports established in 1928
Airfields of the United States Army Air Forces in Florida
Airports in Polk County, Florida
Lake Wales, Florida